Giovanni Di Luigi, O. Carm. was a Roman Catholic prelate who served as 
Bishop of Sant'Agata de' Goti (1512–1519), 
Bishop of Lucera (1500–1512), and 
Bishop of Capri (1491–1500).

Biography
Giovanni Di Luigi ordained a priest in the Carmelite Order.
On 15 July 1491, he was appointed during the papacy of Pope Innocent VIII as Bishop of Capri.
On 25 October 1500, he was appointed during the papacy of Pope Alexander VI as Bishop of Lucera.
On 27 August 1512, he was appointed during the papacy of Pope Julius II as Bishop of Sant'Agata de' Goti.
He served as Bishop of Sant'Agata de' Goti until his resignation in 1519.

References

External links and additional sources
 (for Chronology of Bishops) 
 (for Chronology of Bishops) 
 (for Chronology of Bishops) 
 (for Chronology of Bishops) 
 (for Chronology of Bishops) 
 (for Chronology of Bishops) 

15th-century Italian Roman Catholic bishops
16th-century Italian Roman Catholic bishops
Bishops appointed by Pope Innocent VIII
Bishops appointed by Pope Alexander VI
Bishops appointed by Pope Julius II
Carmelite bishops